The Ambassador from Israel to the Côte d’Ivoire is Israel's foremost diplomatic representative in the Côte d’Ivoire.

List of ambassadors
Eli Ben-Tura 2016 - 
Isi Yanouka 2013 - 2016
Benny Omer 2009 - 2013
Daniel Kedem 2006 - 2008
Michael Arbel 2004 - 2006
Daniel Kedem 2001 - 2004
Benny Omer 2001
Yoel Barnea 1998 - 2000
Yaacov-Jack Revach 1993 - 1997
Gadi Golan 1990 - 1993
Menachem Carmon 1987 - 1990
Arye Gabai 1973 - 1976
Nissim Yosha 1971 - 1973
Joel Alon 1969 - 1970
Hagai Dikan 1963 - 1964
Shlomo Hillel 1961 - 1963

References 

Ivory Coast
Israel